Fading Trails is the second studio album by Magnolia Electric Co., a project of indie musician Jason Molina. It is a compilation of tracks from four different recording sessions, including recordings at Electrical Audio in Chicago, engineered by Steve Albini, Sound of Music Studio in Richmond, Virginia, produced by David Lowery, and Sun Studios in Memphis, Tennessee, engineered by James Lott. All of Fading Trails''' songs are featured on the boxset Sojourner''.

Track listing
"Don't Fade on Me" – 4:15
"Montgomery" – 1:48
"Lonesome Valley" – 3:36
"A Little at a Time" – 3:05
"The Old Horizon" – 3:13
"Memphis Moon" – 3:16
"Talk to Me Devil, Again" – 3:28
"Spanish Moon Fall and Rise" – 2:44
"Steady Now" – 2:53

References

External links
Secretly Canadian press release

2006 albums
Jason Molina albums
Secretly Canadian albums
Albums produced by Steve Albini